The Federation of Malaya competed at the 1960 Summer Olympics in Rome, Italy. Nine competitors, all men, took part in eleven events in four sports. It was the second Olympic appearance by the nation, which expanded and was renamed as Malaysia in 1963.

Athletics

Men
Track events

Field event

Shooting

Men

Swimming

Men

Weightlifting

Men

References

External links
 Official Olympic Reports
 Olympic Council Malaysia

Nations at the 1960 Summer Olympics
1960
1960 in Malayan sport